"The Only Promise That Remains" is a country duet recorded by American singers Reba McEntire and Justin Timberlake for McEntire's 24th studio album, Reba: Duets (2007). It was written and produced by Timberlake, with additional writing from Matt Morris. McEntire and Timberlake met at the 49th Annual Grammy Awards ceremony in February 2007, where McEntire asked him to be a part of the album. She was initially skeptical when Timberlake suggested that he write a song for her, expecting it to be "something that was wayyy out of [her] ballpark". She was relieved when he played "The Only Promise That Remains", an acoustic-based Celtic love song, for her.

"The Only Promise That Remains" received lukewarm reviews from contemporary music critics, who deemed it a surprising collaboration. Some critics, however, noted that "The Only Promise That Remains" was not as strong as others tracks on Reba: Duets. The song was serviced to country radio in the United States by MCA Nashville on November 5, 2007 as the second single from Reba: Duets. The single failed to chart on the US Hot Country Songs chart, but peaked at 72 on the US Pop 100 chart and at number five on the US Bubbling Under Hot 100 Singles chart. McEntire and Timberlake performed the song live on The Oprah Winfrey Show on September 19, 2007.

Writing and production 

Reba McEntire began work on her 24th studio album, Reba: Duets, by creating a "wish list" of pop and country singers that she would like to duet with. After completing her residency show at the Las Vegas Hilton, McEntire began reaching out to the artists on her list, by phone and e-mail. She came into contact with Justin Timberlake through Joanna García, who portrayed McEntire's daughter on the sitcom Reba and was dating Timberlake's friend Trace Ayala. Timberlake and McEntire met for the first time at the 49th Annual Grammy Awards ceremony on February 11, 2007. She asked him to be a part of the project, to which he replied: "Okay, great, I'll write something. Is that okay?". McEntire was skeptical at first, unsure of "what he was going to bring back to [her]". According to McEntire, she didn't know if the song was going to be "SexyBack 2, 3 or 4". She revealed: "I was really nervous. I didn't know how I was going to say no to a song I didn't like if Justin had written it."

On February 12, Timberlake wrote, alongside Matt Morris, "The Only Promise That Remains" for McEntire. When she heard the song, she was "so relieved", as she was expecting the song to be "something that was wayyy out of [her] ballpark". Timberlake produced the song, while Morris provided background vocals. McEntire's vocals were recorded by Chris Ashburn and Kevin Mills at Starstruck Studios in Nashville, while Timberlake's were recorded by Jeff Rothschild at Henson Recording Studios in Hollywood. Larry Gold arranged and conducted the strings, which were provided by Alyssa Park, Amy Wickman, Caroline Buckman and the Section Quartet. Rob Ickes performed the dobro, while Glenn Worf performed the upright bass. The song was mixed by Jean-Marie Horvat, with assistance from Colin Miller at Oz Recording Studios in Valencia.

Recalling the events, McEntire revealed that the collaboration "worked out really great". Of Timberlake, she said: "He's a sweetheart, a very good old country boy from Memphis, Tenn., and he's a huge fan of country music so it worked out wonderfully well". Timberlake dedicated the song to his grandfather, an avid country music fan. Timberlake announced their collaboration in May 2007, revealing that he was "making [his] grandfather very proud by working with someone like Reba McEntire".

Composition and reception 
"The Only Promise That Remains" is a country song that lasts for a duration of five minutes and six seconds. It is an acoustic-based Celtic love song whose instrumentation consists of strings, cello fills, the dobro and an upright bass. Randy Vest of People described the song as "a gentle, strikingly simple duet". Timberlake's harmonies performed throughout the song were praised by Allmusic's Thom Jurek, who wrote that "it's a welcome surprise" which is "more about serving the song than about not being able to sing".

According to Jurek, the song is "maybe a tad longer" than it should be, although he specified that it was a "small complaint". Lana Cooper of PopMatters questioned the strength of the song, and Billboard'''s KT agreed, calling the song the most "unexpected cut" on the album and that "one could picture the pair singing it at a writer's night somewhere". Cooper wrote that in Timberlake's "unexpected surprise cameo" he "fades into a secondary role", as opposed to the other artists on Reba: Duets that "make a strong showing" next to McEntire. She wrote that Timberlake "sounds pretty enough" and that he does "contribute a certain mood" to the song, however, commented that "anyone expecting more of a collaborative effort out of him would be sorely disappointed".

 Charts 
On the week of October 6, 2007, "The Only Promise That Remains" debuted at number 72 on the Billboard'' Pop 100.

Release history

References 

2007 songs
2007 singles
Reba McEntire songs
Justin Timberlake songs
Male–female vocal duets
Songs written by Justin Timberlake
Songs written by Matt Morris (musician)
Song recordings produced by Justin Timberlake
MCA Records singles